An astrolabe is an astronomical instrument.

Astrolabe may also refer to:
 , one of several French ships
 Astrolabe Bay, a large body of water off the northern coast Papua New Guinea
 Astrolabe Company, German colonial society
 Astrolabe Island, island in the Bransfield Strait, northwest of Cape Ducorps, Trinity Peninsula, Antarctica
 Astrolabe Lake,  lake in Renfrew County, Ontario, Canada
 Astrolabe languages,  group of Austronesian languages of Madang Province, Papua New Guinea
 Astrolabe Reef, a reef located off the port of Tauranga, New Zealand
 Astrolab, an astronomy museum associated with the Mont Mégantic Observatory in Mont Mégantic Park, Québec, Canada
 Mariner's astrolabe, a navigational tool that differs from a proper astrolabe
 The son of Abelard and Heloise, called Astralabius in Latin. (This name is usually spelled Astralabe in English, but occasionally Astrolabe. Heloise named him after the astronomical instrument.)
 Astrolabe v. Olson was a 2011 lawsuit filed against the maintainers of the tz Database